Rebbetzin Bruria David (born 1938) is a Haredi Jewish rebbetzin and Torah scholar. She is the founder and dean of Beth Jacob Jerusalem (commonly known as BJJ), a prestigious Haredi religious girls seminary located in the Unsdorf neighborhood of Jerusalem, Israel. She is the only child of Rabbi Yitzchak Hutner, Rosh Yeshiva of Yeshiva Rabbi Chaim Berlin, and the wife of Rabbi Yonasan David, Rosh Yeshiva of Yeshiva Pachad Yitzchok in Jerusalem's Har Nof neighborhood. Together with her husband and parents, she was on one of the airplanes hijacked by the Black September terrorists in 1970.

Early life and education
David is the daughter of Rabbi Yitzchak Hutner and Masha Lipshitz. Her parents married in 1933 and moved to Mandatory Palestine, but returned to New York a year later, where Bruria was born.

She received her doctorate in history from Columbia University in 1971 as a student of Salo Baron. Her dissertation, titled The Dual Role of Rabbi Zvi Hirsch Chajes: Traditionalist and Maskil, deals with Rabbi Chajes's relationships in the traditional world of Orthodox Judaism as well insights upon his worldview and beliefs based on his publications, halachic writings and personal correspondence.

BJJ

David founded Beth Jacob Jerusalem (BJJ), also known as Machon Sarah Shneirer, in the early 1970s as a post high school seminary in Israel, which is geared for American and European graduates of Bais Yaakov who wish to pursue Torah study on an advanced academic level. Previously, she had a seminary in Esther Schonfeld of the East Side, and then in Bais Yaakov Academy. The seminary also provides professional training toward a teaching degree. David personally interviews each applicant.

Black September hijacking

In 1970, David and her husband accompanied her parents on a trip to Israel. During the return flight to New York on 6 September 1970, their plane was hijacked by the PFLP Palestinian terrorist organization. The terrorists freed the non-Jewish passengers and held the Jewish passengers hostage on the plane for one week, after which the women and children – including David and her mother – were released and sent to Cyprus. The hijacked airplanes were subsequently detonated. The remaining 40-plus Jewish men – including Rabbis Hutner and David, and two students accompanying Hutner, Rabbi Meir Fund and Rabbi Yaakov Drillman – and male flight crew continued to be held hostage in and around Amman, Jordan; Hutner was held alone in an isolated location while Jews around the world prayed for his safe return. Hutner and David were finally released on 26 September and flown to Nicosia, Cyprus. On 28 September Hutner, David, their wives and students were flown back to New York via Europe, and were home in time for the first night of Rosh Hashana.

Scholarship
Together with her husband, Yonasan David, Bruria edited the works of her father, entitled Pachad Yitzchok (Dread of Isaac). The couple also compiled and published the official biography of Hutner, entitled Sefer HaZikaron (Book of Remembrance).

References

External links
Bruria Hutner David's full PhD thesis (PDF)

American Orthodox Jews
Israeli Orthodox Jews
Rebbetzins
Columbia Graduate School of Arts and Sciences alumni
1936 births
Living people